Dry, warm conditions in the spring set the stage for fires in Siberia in May 2018.

History
In mid-July 2018, smoke from the fires could be seen by satellites reaching North America. The Siberian Times reported  were burning.

On July 24, the U.S. National Weather Service said smoke had crossed the Canada-U.S. border and reached Bellingham, Washington. Siberian fires were partly blamed by Environment Canada which issued an air quality statement on July 25 for Prince George, BC. On July 29, the Puget Sound Clean Air Agency stated the Puget Sound region would experience "moderate air quality at times with some upper level smoke making for pretty sunsets. This smoke comes from distant fires, mostly originating from Siberia."

See also

 2021 Russian wildfires
 2019 Russian wildfires
 2015 Russian wildfires
 2010 Russian wildfires
 1987 Black Dragon fire
 List of wildfires § Russia
 List of heat waves

References

2018 disasters in Russia
2018 wildfires
Wildfires in Russia
Natural disasters in Siberia
May 2018 events in Russia
June 2018 events in Russia
July 2018 events in Russia